The Diocese of Dacia Felix is the Romanian Orthodox diocese of the Romanians in Serbia (including Vlachs).

History
In 1971, the Romanian parishes in the Serbian Banat were merged into a vicariate whose center was Vršac, Serbia, and which was part of the Metropolis of Banat. This vicariate would later be ascended to the Diocese of Dacia Felix in 1997. The city of Deta in Romania was chosen as its official center, while Vršac remained as the administrative headquarters.

In the early 2000s, the diocese began to expand its influence over the Timok Valley, region that the Serbian Orthodox Church considers its own. On 31 March 2001, Daniil Stoenescu became the bishop of the diocese. In 2005, the first temple in the Timok Valley with services performed in Romanian was built. Serbian authorities viewed it as illegal and attempted to demolish it, but did not do so due to external pressure. The diocese was withdrawn from the Metropolis of Banat in 2009 to be directly subordinate to the Patriarch of All Romania. On 1 August 2017, Siluan Mănuilă, bishop of the Diocese of Gyula in Hungary, became leader of the diocese due to health problems of Stoenescu.

See also
 Roman Dacia, also known as Dacia Felix

References

Dacia Felix
Romanian Orthodox Church in Serbia
Romanians in Serbia
Vlachs of Serbia
Romania–Serbia relations
1997 establishments in Serbia